Honduras has rich folk traditions that derive from the fusion of four different cultural groups: indigenous, European, African and Creole. Each department or region, municipality, village and even hamlet contributes its own traditions including costumes, music, beliefs, stories, and all the elements that derive from and are transformed by peoples in a population. In sum, these define Honduran Folklore as expressed by crafts, tales, legends, music and dances.

Tales and Legends of Honduras 

Numerous characters form part of the folklore and popular beliefs of Honduras. Some are designed to terrorize listeners, while others try to convince listeners to behave well or they may suffer an unhappy outcome described in a story. The exact details of a story often differs between villages or regions, or according to the style of a story teller. Some characters of legend that stand out are:

Folk Music of Honduras

Indigenous music 
The music of the indigenous groups is derived from cultural traditions of the pre-Hispanic civilizations of Central America. Indigenous groups still in Honduras include the Lenca, Miskitu, Tawahka, Pech, Maya Chortis, and Xicaques. Indigenous traditions have been well documented. Some of the pre-Hispanic musical instruments include Mud Frogs Whistles (type of whistle made from clay or mud in the shape of a frog), conch shells, tortoise shells, and maracas. The maracas are two hollowed-out shells, which contain natural seeds, called "tears of Saint Peter." Other traditional Honduran instruments used with indigenous dance include the marimba, caramba, and accordion, along with drums.

Creole music 
 El Candú - 
 Pitero (The Armadillo)
 Flores de Mimé
 El Bananero
 Los inditos
 El costeño (The man from the [Miskito] coast)
 El Tartamudo
 Corrido a Honduras (Run to Honduras)
 La  valona
 Adios Garcita morena
 Al rumor de las selvas Hondureñas (To the rumour of the Honduran jungles) by Carlos Maria Varela

Typical clothing 
There is a variety of Honduran traditional or folkloric clothes and costumes, mostly named for the region from which they originated. Traditional clothing and music are often labeled by one of four broad categories:
 Indigenous (originating from native traditions dating back before the colonial conquest)
 Creole (resulting from the mix of European and indigenous traditions)
 Colonial (resulting from European roots)
 Garifuna (resulting from African roots)
Within these categories, costumes are categorized by specific region (department, city or municipality, village, or hamlet) and ethnic group from which they originate. The following is a list of some of the traditional costumes:
 Costume of Carrizalón and Tapesco (village Carrizalón municipality of Copán Ruinas, Copán Department)
 Costume of Cacautare (village in the municipality of Pespire, department of Choluteca) 
 Costume of Jocomico (department of Francisco Morazán)
 Costume of Copán (department)
 Maya Ch'orti costume
 Costume of the Muslims and Christians (Saint Andrés, Ocotepeque Department)
 Costume of the Viejos (Saint Andrés, and Saint Rafael, province of Ocotepeque)
 Costume of the Forastines (Saint Andrés, and Saint Rafael, province of Ocotepeque)
 Costume of Linaca (in the department of Choluteca)
 Costume of Opatoro (municipality in the department of La Paz)
 Costume from Santa Barbará (hamlet of Escondido, Estancia municipality of Santa Bárbara Department, Honduras
 Campesino costume from Santa Barbará
 Guancasco costume of Gracias and Mejicapa Lempira Department
 Dance costume of Garrobo (La Campa, Lempira Department
 Mogigangas costume (Chinda, Gualala and Ilama, municipality of Santa Barbará)
 Colonial princess-style costume of Comayagua Department
 Lamaní costume, department of Comayagua
 Negrito costume (municipality of Santa Elena, La Paz)
 Costume of La Paz department
 Costume of Marcala, La Paz
 Indigenous costume of La Esperanza, Intibucá
 Costume of Guajiniquil (village of Guajiniquil, municipality of Concepción, department of Intibucá)
 Costume from La Villa de Camasca (municipality Camasca, department of Intibucá)
 Costume of the department of Francisco Morazán
 Costume of Comayagua
 Costumes of the Muslims and Christians of Ojojona and Lepaterique (department of Francisco Morazán)
 Costume of Tolupan (mountain of the flower) department of Francisco Morazán
 Costume of Valley of Agalta (village the Avocado, municipality of Saint Esteban, department of Olancho)
 Costume of Sierra de Agalta. (villages The Avocado, Dead Bull, the Sale, municipality of Saint Esteban, department of Olancho)
 Costume of Coyolar (hamlet Coyolar, municipality of Saint Esteban, department of Olancho)
 Costume of Los Desmontes (village Los Desmontes, municipality of San Francisco de la Paz, department of Olancho)
 Costume of Tilapa (village of Tilapa, municipality of San Francisco de la Paz, department of Olancho)
 costume of Santa Elena (village Pedrero, municipality of Saint Esteban, department of Olancho)
 Pech costume (department of Olancho and Yoro)
 Tawahkas costume (department of Olancho)
 Gracias a Dios costume, Misquitos costume
 Cortés costume, Omoa costume (department of Cortés)
 Atlántida costume, costume of La Ceiba
 Costumes of Afro-Caribbean ethnicity from Colon
 Indigenous costumes of Muslims and Christians of Ojojona and Lepaterique. (Ojojona, department of Francisco Morazán)
 clothes of the blacks of Gracias and Mejicapa (Graciasand Mejicapa, department of Lempira)
 Dance costume of San Sebastián, Lempira (the dance of the crowns between San Sebastián and Mejicapa)
 Costume of the Muslims and Christian (Saint Andrés, department of Ocotepeque)
 Costume of the Garrobo (La Campa, department of Lempira)
 Mogigangas costume (Chinda, Gualala and Ilama, department of Santa Barbará, Francisco Morazán Department)
 Forastines costume (San Andrés, department of Ocotepeque)
 Veijos costume (San Andrés, department of Ocotepeque)
 Tolupan costume (Montaña de la Flor, department of Francisco Morazán)

Dance in Honduras 
Honduran folklore is very varied and interesting by the cultural elements that result in the four major ethnic groups (indigenous, creole or mestizos, Spaniards, and Garífuna). As each province has its own traditions, music and beliefs, so it was for dance.

Indigenous dances 
The indigenous dances are influenced primarily by the pre-Columbian culture. The following are indigenous dances that have been authenticated by the National Office of Folklore:

Creole Dances 
The creole (or mestizo) dances result from the mix of indigenous and Europeans in the new world. The following are creole dances that have been authenticated by the National Office of Folklore:

Imitative Creole Dances 
These dances have movements characteristic of animals and also of some activities like fairs, bullfights, frights, flights of birds, and hunts.

Colonial Dances 
The dances originating from Spanish colonial influences, which have been assimilated by the people without losing their traditional essence.

Honduran folklorists 
 Henry Leonel Andean (Researcher and collector of dances like El corridito, El corrido de Don Juan, "The Polka of Apakunka" and "The dance of the Junquillo", Director of the Group Yaxall of Honduras)
 Carlos Gómez Genizzotti
 Professor Diógenes Orlando Álvarez Rodas (Choreographer and Investigator) Dances like Los Lirios (The Lilies), El Danzón and La campesina (The Peasant Woman), among others
 Doctor Jesús Aguilar Paz (music and folk habits)
 Jesús Muñoz Tábora (director of the department of the National Folklore in the 80's)
 Jorge Montenegro — Compilation of tales and national legends
 Luis Castellón (collected dances such as: Destrocon, Polca of the dish, for example)
 Professor Pompilio Ortega
Rafael Manzanares Aguilar — Honduran folklorist, author and musical composer; founder and first director of the National Office of Folklore of Honduras (Oficina del Folklore Nacional de Honduras); founder and first director and choreographer of the Cuadro de Danzas Folklóricas de Honduras.
 Rafael Rubio
 Sebastián Martínez Rivera (writer on Honduran folklore)
 Tania Pinto de Moran (Folcloróloga National)
 Wilberto Allan Bonilla Rios — Collected dances such as: La pulgita (The Little Flea), Arranca terrones de Nueva Esperanza (Pull up the clods of Nuevo Esperanza), and Peineta (Comb), among others
 David Adolfo Flores Valladares — Folklorist and innovator in Honduran folk dance
 Johann Seren Castillo — Director of Ballet Folklórico de Honduras Oro Lenca

See also 
 Culture of Honduras
 Folklore
 Literature of Honduras
 Education in Honduras
 Ethnic groups of Honduras
 Art in Honduras
 Gastronomy of Honduras
 Music in Honduras

Notes

References

Further reading 
 
 
 
 

 
Honduran culture